The 1995–96 San Jose Sharks season was the Sharks' fifth season of operation in the National Hockey League. The Sharks failed to make the playoffs for the first time since 1993, finishing with the worst record in the NHL that season.

Offseason

Regular season

The Sharks allowed the most goals (357), the most even-strength goals (244), the most power-play goals (93), had the lowest penalty-kill percentage (76.57%), the fewest shutouts for (0) and the fewest shots on goal (2,143). On Saturday, January 13, 1996, Ray Sheppard scored a hat trick as the Sharks defeated the Pittsburgh Penguins 10-8 in Pittsburgh. It was the highest scoring game of the NHL regular season.

Final standings

Schedule and results

Player statistics

Note: Pos = Position; GP = Games played; G = Goals; A = Assists; Pts = Points; +/- = plus/minus; PIM = Penalty minutes; PPG = Power-play goals; SHG = Short-handed goals; GWG = Game-winning goals
      MIN = Minutes played; W = Wins; L = Losses; T = Ties; GA = Goals-against; GAA = Goals-against average; SO = Shutouts; SA = Shots against; SV = Shots saved; SV% = Save percentage;

Awards and records

Transactions

Draft picks

See also
1995–96 NHL season

References
 

San Jose
San Jose Sharks seasons
San Jose
San Jose Sharks
San Jose Sharks